The 1906 Penn Quakers football team represented the University of Pennsylvania in the 1906 college football season. The Quakers finished with a 7–2–3 record in their fifth year under head coach Carl S. Williams. Significant games included a 24 to 6 loss to the Carlisle Indians, a 17 to 0 victory over Michigan, and a scoreless tie with Cornell  The 1906 Penn team outscored its opponents by a combined total of 186 to 58.

Eight players on the 1906 Penn team received recognition on the 1906 College Football All-America Team.  They are ends Izzy Levene  (WC-3; CW-2; NYS-2; CC-2; NYT-2) and Hunter Scarlett (NYM-1), tackle Dexter Draper (WC-2; NYS-1; NYT-2), guard Gus Ziegler (WC-2; CW-1; NYS-2; CC-2; NYM-1; NYT-2), center William Thomas Dunn (WC-1), and halfbacks Bill Hollenback (WC-2; CW-1; NYS-1; NYM-1), Bob Folwell (NYT-1) and Edward Green (NYT-2).

Schedule

References

Penn
Penn Quakers football seasons
Penn Quakers football